Ousby is a civil parish in the Eden District, Cumbria, England.  It contains 15 listed buildings that are recorded in the National Heritage List for England.  All the listed buildings are designated at Grade II, the lowest of the three grades, which is applied to "buildings of national importance and special interest".  The parish includes the village of Ousby, the surrounding countryside, and hills and fells to the east. Note that Melmerby became a separate parish in April 2019 but this list still includes it. The listed buildings consist of two churches, two medieval cross bases, houses, farmhouses and farm buildings, a former post office, an inn, and a former shepherd's hut, later used as a walkers' hut.


Buildings

References

Citations

Sources

Lists of listed buildings in Cumbria
Eden District